Happy Valley is a British crime drama television series, set and filmed in the Calder Valley, West Yorkshire. Starring Sarah Lancashire and Siobhan Finneran, it was written and created by Sally Wainwright, and directed by Wainwright, Euros Lyn and Tim Fywell. The first series began on BBC One on 29 April 2014, the second on 9 February 2016, and the third and final series on 1 January 2023. It won the 2015 BAFTA Award for Best Drama Series, and won another BAFTA for Best Drama for the second series.

Premise

Series 1
Catherine Cawood is a strong-willed police sergeant in Halifax, West Yorkshire, still coming to terms with the suicide of her teenage daughter, Becky, eight years earlier. Cawood is now divorced from her husband and living with her sister, Clare, a recovering alcoholic and heroin addict, who is helping her bring up Becky's young son, Ryan, the product of rape. Neither Catherine's ex-husband nor their adult son, Daniel, want anything to do with Ryan. Catherine hears that Tommy Lee Royce, the man responsible for the brutal rape that impregnated Becky and drove her to suicide shortly after Ryan was born, is out of prison after serving eight years for drug charges. Catherine soon becomes obsessed with finding Royce, unaware that he is involved in the kidnapping of Ann Gallagher, a plot instigated by Kevin Weatherill and orchestrated by Ashley Cowgill. Things quickly take a dark turn as the abductors scramble to keep the kidnapping secret, although Catherine is on to them.

Series 2
Eighteen months after the events of the first series, Catherine is back at work and has been awarded the Queen's Police Medal (QPM) for gallantry, for rescuing Gallagher from Royce, who is serving a life sentence in prison. When Royce's mother is killed, Catherine finds herself implicated in a string of murders. While trying to prove her innocence, Catherine is tasked with investigating a human trafficking operation linked to the serial killings. Meanwhile, senior HMIT officers Detective Superintendent Andy Shepard and Detective Inspector Jodie Shackleton begin to suspect that the supposed fourth victim of the serial killer, Victoria Fleming, was murdered by someone else. Gradually their investigation starts to lead them towards Victoria's actual killer: police detective John Wadsworth, whom Fleming had been blackmailing. Catherine's grandson, Ryan, develops a friendship with a new teaching assistant, Miss Wealand, who is secretly a prison groupie infatuated with Royce. Royce, whom the court has forbidden from having any contact with Ryan, is using Wealand to try to build a relationship with Ryan and get revenge on Catherine. Ryan increasingly concerns his family by asking questions about his father and even suggests Royce should be forgiven.

Series 3
Taking place seven years after the events of the second series, Catherine is coming close to retirement age, and has plans to go on a hiking expedition to the Himalayas. Catherine is called to investigate the discovery of human remains found near a reservoir, where she comes to realise the murder suspects share a history with Royce, who has since been transferred to a cell in Sheffield and is awaiting trial for a string of unseen offences. Meanwhile, Ryan, who is now 16 years old, has been keeping in touch with his father after sending him a letter at the end of series two, and has been visiting him secretly behind Catherine's back with help from Clare and her new partner Neil. When Catherine finds out, she temporarily blocks contact with the three of them and presents Ryan with an ultimatum. Ryan is also having problems at school with his PE teacher Rob Hepworth, who has kicked him off the football team following accusations of misconduct. At home, Rob is physically abusive towards his wife Joanne (Mollie Winnard), who has developed an addiction to prescription drugs and is receiving them illegally from her pharmacist Faisal Bhatti, who in turn is being blackmailed by a gang of violent dealers in exchange for the freedom of his family.

Episodes

Cast

 Sarah Lancashire as Sgt Catherine Cawood
 Siobhan Finneran as Clare Cartwright
 Charlie Murphy as Ann Gallagher
 James Norton as Tommy Lee Royce
 George Costigan as Nevison Gallagher
 Rhys Connah as Ryan Cawood

Production
On 22 November 2012, Ben Stephenson announced the commissioning of Happy Valley for BBC One. The programme was written by Sally Wainwright, produced by Karen Lewis, and directed by Euros Lyn, Sally Wainwright and Tim Fywell.

Filming began in the Calder Valley in November 2013. Locations in the area included Todmorden, Luddenden, Mytholmroyd, Bradford, Keighley, Sowerby Bridge, Hebden Bridge, and Heptonstall. Huddersfield, Halifax, Bradford, Leeds and other West Yorkshire cities are mentioned, though not main filming locations. A former police station (Station Road, Sowerby Bridge) was used for some scenes, and additional filming took place at North Light Film Studios at Brookes Mill, Huddersfield.

The name "Happy Valley" is what local police in the Calder Valley call the area because of its drug problem.

In the first episode of series one, Ryan points out to Catherine, who is visiting her daughter Becky's grave in the next row, that visitors have left pens at Sylvia Plath's grave.

A second series was commissioned on 18 August 2014. Filming began in August 2015, and the first episode was broadcast on 9 February 2016. The second series was written by Wainwright, produced by Lewis, and directed by Lyn and Wainwright. Catherine's workplace is a former police station in Sowerby Bridge, and her home and local pub (two other main filming locations) are based in Hebden Bridge. The prison scenes were filmed at Oakham Enterprise Park in Rutland, which was HMP Ashwell until its closure.

The main character, Sergeant Cawood, is mentioned in the third episode of the fifth series of Last Tango in Halifax, which aired on BBC One on 9 March 2020. This series was also created and written by Wainwright, set in Halifax, and also stars Sarah Lancashire.

In October 2020, Wainwright confirmed that there would be a third series and that she was in the "early stages" of writing it. Filming for the third series began in January 2022.

Reception
The first episode aired on 29 April 2014 at 21:00, receiving 8.64 million viewers, as the second most watched show of the week (commencing 28 April 2014) for BBC One. The BBC reported that the show received an average consolidated audience of 8.21 million viewers over six episodes, and an additional 8.1 million requests for the show on BBC iPlayer. Radio Times called Happy Valley a "word-of-mouth hit" which "steadily became a success outside the normal audience for the slot and channel."

After episode one aired, Ofcom received four complaints under the category "violence and dangerous behaviour", but they did not pursue the matter.

Reviews from the media have been overwhelmingly positive, and the show has received 100% rating critic review on Rotten Tomatoes. However, some reviewers have criticised the show for its graphic content, especially in episode three and episode four, whilst others have noted the ubiquitous typecasting of male characters as either weak or criminals. 

In response to the criticism, Happy Valleys creator-writer, Wainwright, defended the show as "a quality, well-written drama" and stated, "Judging by the amount of email, texts, tweets I've had, I don't think anyone is asking me to apologise." In an interview with the Radio Times, Wainwright said the level of violence had been carefully considered and it was done responsibly, by showing the psychological and physical damage suffered by Catherine.

Other critics have praised the show. Vicky Frost of The Guardian wrote: "To get hung up on the violence of this BBC1 kidnap drama misses the point. It is beautifully written by Sally Wainwright, draws an astonishing performance from Sarah Lancashire—and between them, they have created something truly unmissable." Gerard O'Donovan of The Telegraph called Happy Valley "complex, thrilling and brilliantly written and acted", and "one of the best watches of 2014". In September 2019, The Guardian ranked the show 11th on its list of the 100 best TV shows of the 21st century, calling it "a corrective to cliché-ridden and frequently blokey police procedurals", and one that "pulsated with poignant realness".

The final episode of series 3, the last ever series, garnered much praise from critics. Lucy Mangan, writing for The Guardian, called the episode as "[b]rutal, tender, funny, compelling and heartbreaking"; Anita Singh, reviewing for The Daily Telegraph, rated the episode 5/5 stars and claimed, "Happy Valley sounds so bleak on paper, with its storylines about drugs, rape and murder. But at its core is the love that Cawood has for her family. Wainwright gave us what we wanted: a happy ending for a character who truly deserves it"; Peter Stanford writing in the Telegraph highlighted the various religious themes, with Cawood taking on "the appearance of a living saint" amidst the evil and misery of Happy Valley. Positive reviews were also published by The Times and I, who rated the episode 5/5 stars.

International

Awards and nominations

Series One

Series Two

Home media
BBC Shop released Happy Valley series one on DVD, in regions two and four, on 16 June 2014. The DVD includes two discs, featuring 351 minutes' worth of footage, and has an age certificate of 15. All six episodes of the series were released on iTunes, both in standard and high definition.

On 20 August 2014, the series was further released on Netflix in Canada and the USA, marketed as a "Netflix Original". However, it departed Netflix in March 2020.

In the summer of 2016 series one of Happy Valley was released on Netflix in the UK and is currently repeated on the channel W. A year later series two was released on Netflix in the UK.

References

External links
 
 
 
 Happy Valley, scripts at BBC TV Drama archive

2014 British television series debuts
2023 British television series endings
2010s British crime drama television series
2010s British police procedural television series
2010s British workplace drama television series
2020s British crime drama television series
2020s British police procedural television series
2020s British workplace drama television series
Television series by Red Production Company
BAFTA winners (television series)
BBC crime drama television shows
Edgar Award-winning works
English-language television shows
Peabody Award-winning television programs
Television series created by Sally Wainwright
Television shows set in West Yorkshire